Alexander Cone is a  cone-shaped feature in the All-Blacks Nunataks, west of the Churchill Mountains in Antarctica. It was named in honor of John Alexander, involved in operational work at Cape Hallett, Scott Base and the Cape Roberts Project for many years, from 1984 onwards.

References
 

Nunataks of Oates Land